is a producer and planning director of anime and other TV series for Fuji TV. He has also worked as a producer on the movies related to various TV series with which he was involved.

Projects
Ashita Tenki ni Naare (planning)
Dr. Slump - Arale-chan (planning, producer)
Dragon Ball (producer)
FNS Bangumi Taikō NG Taishō (organization)
Futari Taka (planning)
High School! Kimengumi (TV series and movie, planning)
Kagaku Kyūjotai Techno Boyger (producer)
Patalliro! (planning)

External links
 Japan Movie Database

Anime directors
Japanese television producers
Japanese film producers
Living people
Year of birth missing (living people)